This list is of the Intangible Cultural Properties of Japan in the Prefecture of Okinawa.

National Cultural Properties
As of 1 January 2015, eleven Important Intangible Cultural Properties have been designated, being of national significance.

Performing Arts

Craft Techniques

Prefectural Cultural Properties
As of 1 May 2014, fourteen properties have been designated at a prefectural level.

Performing Arts

Craft Techniques

Karate - Kobujutsu

Municipal Cultural Properties
As of 1 May 2014, seven properties have been designated at a municipal level.

Performing Arts

Craft Techniques

Oral Literature

Former Cultural Properties

Performing Arts

Craft Techniques

Intangible Cultural Properties that need measures such as making records
As of 1 May 2014, there was one .

Craft Techniques

See also
 Cultural Properties of Japan
 List of Cultural Properties of Japan - crafts (Okinawa)
 Angama (dance)

References

External links
  Cultural Properties in Okinawa Prefecture
  List of Cultural Properties in Okinawa Prefecture

Culture in Okinawa Prefecture
Okinawa